Haploparmena angolana is a species of beetle in the family Cerambycidae. It was described by Per Olof Christopher Aurivillius in 1913 and is known from Angola.

References

Endemic fauna of Angola
Morimopsini
Beetles described in 1913